Gilbert Dubier (14 September 1931 – 10 April 2019) was a French wrestler. He competed in the men's Greco-Roman bantamweight at the 1960 Summer Olympics.

References

1931 births
2019 deaths
French male sport wrestlers
Olympic wrestlers of France
Wrestlers at the 1960 Summer Olympics
Sportspeople from Nantes